Inday may refer to:

Inday, a U.S. manufacturer of electronics whose owner named the company after his Filipino wife's nickname
 Fasullo/Inday, a character in the GMA Network television series Zaido: Pulis Pangkalawakan
 Inday Ba or N'Deaye Ba, (10 August 1972 – 20 April 2005), a Swedish-Senegalese film, stage, and television actress  
 Inday Badiday or Lourdes Jimenez Carvajal, (August 6, 1944 –September 26, 2003), a Filipino host and journalist 
 "Inday" Happylou Magtibay (played by Barbie Forteza), a main character in the 2018 GMA Network television series Inday Will Always Love You
 Sara Duterte (born 1978), commonly known as Inday Sara, Filipino politician and 15th vice president of the Philippines
 Typhoon Inday, the name of six typhoons in the Northwestern Pacific Ocean

Filipino feminine given names